Yves Pignot (born 31 March 1946) is a French actor. He appeared in more than one hundred films since 1969.

Filmography

References

External links 

1946 births
Living people
French male film actors